Peter Liu Cheng-chung is a Roman Catholic prelate of the Roman Catholic Diocese of Kaohsiung, Taiwan.

Peter Liu has been chairman of Fu Jen Catholic University since 2009.

Early life 
Liu was born on 12 April 1951 in Chiayi, Taiwan.

Priesthood 
On 13 April 1980, Liu was ordained a Catholic priest.

Episcopate 
Liu was appointed bishop of the Roman Catholic Diocese of Chiayi on 1 July 1994 and consecrated on 28 September 1994 Jozef Tomko. On 5 July 2004 he was appointed Coadjutor Bishop of the Roman Catholic Diocese of Kaohsiung and succeeded as bishop of the same diocese on 5 January 2006. He was appointed the Bishop of the Roman Catholic Diocese of Kaohsiung on 21 November 2009 as an Archbishop ad personam.

References

External links

Living people
1951 births
20th-century Roman Catholic bishops in Taiwan
21st-century Roman Catholic archbishops in Taiwan
Taiwanese Roman Catholic archbishops
People from Chiayi